The Interstate Highways in Michigan are the segments of the national Dwight D. Eisenhower System of Interstate and Defense Highways that are owned and maintained by the U.S. state of Michigan, totaling about . The longest of these, Interstate 75 (I-75), is also the longest highway of any kind in the state. On a national level, the standards and numbering for the system are handled by the Federal Highway Administration (FHWA) and the American Association of State Highway and Transportation Officials (AASHTO), while the highways in Michigan are maintained by the Michigan Department of Transportation (MDOT) and the Mackinac Bridge Authority (MBA). The Interstates in Michigan have their origins in World War II-era expressways built in the Detroit area. After the system was created in 1956, the state highway department completed its first border-to-border Interstate in 1960. The last highway was completed in 1992, giving Michigan a total of 13 Interstate freeways.  The original allotment of mileage to Michigan which would receive federal funding was expanded in 1968, and the United States Congress designated an additional highway in the 1990s that has not yet been built.

There are also 26 current business routes that connect cities bypassed by the Interstates; 23 are business loops that connect on both ends to their parent highway, and three are business spurs that connect on only one end. I-496 has the Capitol Loop as its connection to the Michigan State Capitol in downtown Lansing. Another six business routes have been designated but are either no longer signed or maintained as state highways.

Description
MDOT is the agency responsible for the day-to-day maintenance and operations of the State Trunkline Highway System, which includes the Interstate Highways in Michigan. These highways are built to Interstate Highway standards, meaning they are all freeways with minimum requirements for full control of access, design speeds of  depending on type of terrain, a minimum of two travel lanes in each direction, and specific widths of lanes or shoulders; exceptions from these standards have to be approved by the FHWA. The numbering scheme used to designate the Interstates was developed by AASHTO, an organization composed of the various state departments of transportation in the United States.

There are additional 29 business routes associated with the system in Michigan. The length of I-75, the longest highway of any kind in the state, includes the Mackinac Bridge, which is maintained by the MBA, the only section of state highway not under MDOT jurisdiction. The Mackinac Bridge is one of three monumental bridges in the state used by I-75; the others are the Zilwaukee and International bridges. A fourth, the privately owned Ambassador Bridge connects I-75 and I-96 in Detroit to Canada.

History
Construction of the first expressways in Michigan predates the Interstate Highway System. During World War II, the Michigan State Highway Department (MSHD) built the Willow Run and Detroit Industrial expressways (now part of I-94) to carry workers from Detroit to the defense plants at Willow Run Airport. The state created the Michigan Turnpike Authority (MTA) in 1951, which proposed the construction of a toll freeway to run north–south in the state. The original termini for the Michigan Turnpike were Bridgeport and Rockwood. Interagency politics stalled progress on any proposed turnpikes while MSHD had three freeways under planning or construction.

The Interstate Highway System was authorized by the Federal Aid Highway Act of 1956, and the state had already designed several freeways for its portion of that system. Seizing the opportunity brought by a 1957 state law, the department sold $700 million in bonds (equivalent to $ in 2011) in the late 1950s and early 1960s to finance land purchases and construction of the new freeways. The MSHD delayed numbering these freeways as part of the Interstate Highway System until the federal government had finalized the designations to be assigned to Michigan's freeways. The first highway to be signed as an Interstate in Michigan was I-75, which received signage in late 1959, along a section near the Ohio state line that opened to traffic in October 1957. I-94 was the first of the Interstates to be completed border to border in a US state. In 1974, the state implemented mileage-based exit numbers along the Interstates in Michigan.

Included in these requests were the extension of the Davison Freeway (now M-8), the extension of I-69 from Marshall to Port Huron, and the conversion of the northern sections of US Highway 23 (US 23) and US 131. Of these, the I-69 proposal was approved when the United States Congress extended it to terminate in at I-75 in Flint. The highway was lengthened twice more: to I-475 in 1973 and to Port Huron on February 10, 1987. These last two extensions were classified non-chargeable mileage, or segments not financed through the Interstate Highway fund. The federal government paid 90 percent of the cost of the chargeable mileage originally approved.

The last of Michigan's Interstates to be completed was I-69, the last segment of which opened in 1992. Since then, the United States Congress has designated an additional primary Interstate, I-73 in the state. All studies by MDOT on that highway were cancelled in 2001 over funding concerns. Press reports state there is a "lack of need" for the freeway in the state, and the department has no plans to revive I-73 as of 2011.
If built as designated, I-73 would cross into Michigan near Toledo, Ohio, and connect Jackson, Lansing, and Clare to I-75 at Grayling.

Primary Interstates

Auxiliary Interstates

 was completed in 1974 as a connector from Grand Rapids to I-94 in the Benton Harbor–St. Joseph area.

Proposed Interstates

Business routes

See also

Notes

References

Footnotes

Works cited

External links

Michigan Highways

Interstate Guide

 
Interstate Highways